The Firebird Tribute is a German single-place, paraglider that was designed and produced by Firebird Sky Sports AG of Füssen in the mid-2000s. It is now out of production.

Design and development
The Tribute was designed as an advanced and competition glider. The models are each named for their relative size.

Variants
Tribute M
Mid-sized model for medium-weight pilots. The glider model is AFNOR Competition certified.
Tribute  L
Large-sized model for heavier pilots. The glider model is AFNOR Competition certified.

Specifications (Tribute L)

References

Tribute
Paragliders